The Puerta de Triana was the generic name for an Almohad gate and a Christian gate rose in the same place. It was one of the gates of the walled enclosure of Seville (Andalusia).

On the site previously stood a gate dating from the Almohad period that was demolished to build the Puerta de Triana in 1588. It was located at the junction of the calles Gravina,  Reyes Católicos and Zaragoza. It was the only one walls gate in Seville who had three arches, so it was called "Puerta de Trina" which quickly led to Triana because it is the natural communication with said neighborhood across the bridge puente de Barcas.  Outside of Triana when it would expect it to be in the Plaza de Altozano. This gate was well known for its confluence with the calles Santas Patronas, is considered one of the most majestic walls gate existed in Seville for its elegance and height.

Description 

The style of this gate was Doric and although is not documented its authorship, some scholars argue that its traces were designed by the architect Juan de Herrera; the same who built the building of the Casa Lonja today General Archive of the Indies.

It consists of one body and had two tall and elegant facades, not in vain was always regarded as the most artistic city gate of Seville. In the center, it showed a large semicircular arch and the two sides thereof, respective pairs of columns with fluted shafts, which held a large cornice on stood out a balcony. The closing of that monument it composed a triangular attic adorned with statues and six small pyramids. At the bottom of the ledge belonging to the balcony appeared a tombstone with the inscription:

 (Written in Spanish).

In the gap or intermediate space between the two facades there is a large lounge called "El Castillo", which was used as a prison for prisoners belonging to the nobility; the same use that had the Torre del Oro in the late Middle Ages.

Destruction 

The why of the demolition of this gate was the construction of the Station of Córdoba, the works of the bridge Puente de Isabel II and in El Arenal, which almost led to order its demolition. The city grew and this, instead of jumping on the battlements of the walls, decided to tear it down. The journey of Queen Isabel II to Seville in 1868 was the trigger that prompted definitively the demolition of the gate, at the height of the revolutionary government.

This gate, one of the last to collapse, was the one that was closer to salvation. No doubt it turned efforts the intellectuals of the city, but the First Republic, hungry for revenge, wanted to erase all signs of monarchy in the city of Seville, and this gate was definitely part of that symbol. On September 21, 1868, after several pardons, its sentence for demolition was signed, and in less than 40 days was demolished.

Remains 

Curiously, in the current steely changes of color in what was the plant of the gate and the width of the street it was who had the arch.

Its remains were divided into two destinations, some of them served as a foundation for building of the 24th house on the calle San Eloy, house belonging to the contractor who carried out the demolition; the other remain was sold to "Aguas de Jerez", which also sold much of the fountains and cobblestone dismantled the city in that decade. In turn, some of these remains it used the same Jerezian company to create the deposit of the Zoo of Jerez de la Frontera and in fact, today part of these stones are exposed in this zoo as a trophy.

See also 

 Walls of Seville

References

Bibliography 
 PASSOLA JÁUREGUI, Jaime. "Apuntes para conocer Sevilla". Seville: Publisher Jirones de azul, 2006.
 AGUILAR PIÑAR, Francisco. De Híspalis a Sevilla. Nuevas aportaciones históricas.Seville: Publisher: Ediciones Alfar, 2008.
 AMADOR DE LOS RÍOS, José. Sevilla pintoresca o descripción de sus más célebres monumentos artísticos. Barcelona: Publisher: Ediciones El Albir, S.A., 1979.

City gates in Spain
Demolished buildings and structures in Seville
Buildings and structures completed in 1588
Former gates
Buildings and structures demolished in 1868